Aman Ali is a male Muslim given name formed from the elements aman and Ali. It thus means "security, safety; peace; shelter, protection. It is the name of:

Aman Ali Khan (1888–1953), Indian singer and composer
Amaan Ali Khan (born 1977), Indian musician
Aman Ali (comedian) (born 1985), American comedian
Aman Ali (cricketer) (born 1989), Emirati cricketer

Arabic masculine given names